Tahir Iqbal (born 15 May 1951) is a Pakistani politician and former army officer who had been a member of the National Assembly of Pakistan, from 2002 to 2007 and again from June 2013 to May 2018.

Early life
He was born on 15 May 1951.

He is a retired Major from Pakistan Army.

Political career 

Iqbal was elected to the National Assembly of Pakistan as a candidate of Pakistan Muslim League (Q) from Constituency NA-60 (Chakwal-I) in 2002 Pakistani general election. He received 72,331 votes and defeated Ayaz Amir, a candidate of the Pakistan Muslim League (N) (PML-N).

In November 2002, he was inducted into the federal cabinet of Prime Minister Zafarullah Khan Jamali and was appointed as the Minister of State (Incharge) for Environment where he remained until June 2004. In June 2004, he was inducted into the federal cabinet of Prime Minister Chaudhry Shujaat and was made Minister of State for Environment where he remained until August 2004. In August 2004, he was inducted into the federal cabinet of Prime Minister Shaukat Aziz and was made Federal Minister for Environment with the additional portfolio of Kashmir Affairs and Northern Areas.

He joined PML-N in 2011.

He was re-elected to the National Assembly as a candidate of PML-N from Constituency NA-60 (Chakwal-I) in 2013 Pakistani general election. He received 130,821 votes and defeated an independent candidate, Sardar Ghulam Abbas.

References 

Living people
1951 births
Pakistan Army officers
Pakistani MNAs 2002–2007
Pakistani MNAs 2013–2018
Pakistan Muslim League (Q) MNAs
Pakistan Muslim League (N) MNAs
People from Chakwal District